Drohkaal is a 1994 Indian Hindi-language crime drama film directed and produced by Govind Nihalani, which deals with India's fight against terrorism. The film examines the mental and psychological trauma that honest police officers go through in their fight against a group of ruthless terrorists. It was remade simultaneously in 1995 in Tamil and Telugu as Kuruthipunal and Drohi.

Plot
Indian cities are being terrorized by a group of people who want the government to give in to their demands and are willing to go to any extent for that purpose. Honest, experienced and diligent cops Abhay Singh and Abbas Lodhi are part of the anti-terrorism task force set up by the government to eliminate the menace.

Abbas Lodhi decides to infiltrate the terrorist group with two undercover cops, Anand and Shiv, to gather information. Only Abbas and Abhay know about this operation.

Anand, one of the undercover cops, is exposed by the terrorists a few years later. However, he dies by consuming cyanide before they can get any information from him. But Shiv wins the trust and respect of everyone in the gang, including the mastermind Commander Bhadra himself.

Bhadra is captured and tortured by the police. But try as they may, he does not reveal anything to Abbas or Abhay. While Bhadra is in jail, the gang chooses a sharpshooter to kill a minister, and he does. But the assailant is apprehended and interrogated by Abhay. But Inspector Tiwari poisons the prisoner.

Soon, a respected officer, IGP Pathak, who is a friend of Abhay and Lodhi, kills himself when the CBI come to arrest him on charges of being linked with the terrorists. Abhay and Lodhi then realise there are many terrorist-allied infiltrators. Now Bhadra offers Abhay the chance to join with and help the terrorists, or else his family will be in danger. Abhay does not oblige. The terrorists kill the family dog, shoot Abhay's son in the leg, and send him threatening messages.

Abhay finally agrees. Bhadra asks for Abhay to feign a kidnapping and allow him to escape, which he unwillingly does. Lodhi is shocked at Bhadra's escape, and does not understand why Abhay is acting strangely.

Now outside, Bhadra sends two people, Surinder and Mala, to stay in Abhay's house, and asks the latter to accommodate them. The two of them keep Bhadra informed, and threaten to kill Abhay's wife and child if he were to try anything funny at any time. Only Abhay knows their true identity.

Soon Bhadra meets Abhay, and under threat of his wife and child being killed by Bhadra's signaling to the couple at their house, Abhay reveals that it was Lodhi who had arranged for two undercover cops to be sent to the gang, and only he knows who Dhanush really is. Abhay also learns that Inspector Tiwari, who was supporting Bhadra, has been eliminated.

The gang attacks Lodhi. He almost starts to finish them off, when he sees that one of the people sent to capture him is Shiv, so he goes along with them. Lodhi is beaten, but he does not reveal who the inside man is. Soon he is killed accidentally by Bhadra's pistol. Abhay tells everything to Sumitra, who tells Abhay that as a Police officer, he had taken an oath to protect the nation, and he must go by that. She also says that she will take care of everyone and everything in his absence.

Consoled, Abhay is then called for a late night meeting by Bhadra again. When he leaves for Lodhi's house first, Surinder tries to attack and rape Lodhi's daughter who was being taken care of by Abhay and his wife. At this point, Mala orders Surinder at gunpoint to leave the girl, but Surinder shoots Mala. Sumitra sees all this, and in order to save him, seduces Surinder. Once in the bedroom, she pushes Surinder off, and kills him with his own gun.

Abhay Singh is informed and he returns home, and consoles his family and bids them goodbye. He goes to meet Bhadra, where he attacks the criminal and is overpowered and bound to a chair. With only Shiv in the room, Commander Bhadra asks Abhay about the inside man, and suddenly points the pistol at Shiv. Abhay jumps off, attacks Bhadra, breaks free and stabs him in the neck with the broken wood of the chair. On hearing the commotion, as the entire gang comes from outside to break into the room, Abhay tells Shiv to shoot him, because then it will appear as though Abhay was killed when he attacked Bhadra, and Shiv being highly trusted, would become the new gang leader. A reluctant Shiv does so, just as the gang enters. Shiv declares himself to be the terrorist gang leader, and the others accept his leadership. Abhay Singh then dies.

Cast
 Om Puri as DCP Abhay Singh
 Naseeruddin Shah as DCP Abbas Lodhi
 Mita Vashisht as Sumitra Singh
 Ashish Vidyarthi as Commander Bhadra
 Amrish Puri as IGP Pathak
 Milind Gunaji as Shiv
 Shrivallabh Vyas as Inspector Tiwari
 Manoj Bajpayee as Anand

Music
A. R. Rahman was supposed to debut as music director in Bollywood with Drohkaal, but his computer which contained the music for the film crashed and he never got the time to start over.

Awards
Ashish Vidyarthi won the National Film Award for Best Supporting Actor. His performance was cited as "bringing credibility to his role with strength and total conviction". In 1996, Mita Vasisht won the Star Screen Award for Best Supporting Actress. In 1995, Nihalani won the Best Director Award at the Damascus International Film Festival for the film.

References

External links
 

1990s Hindi-language films
1994 films
Indian police films
Fictional portrayals of the Maharashtra Police
Films about terrorism in India
Films shot in Mumbai
Films featuring a Best Supporting Actor National Film Award-winning performance
Hindi films remade in other languages
Indian crime drama films
1994 crime drama films
Films directed by Govind Nihalani